Donald Kachamba (1953–2001) was a Malawian musician, composer and bandleader.

Biography 

Kachamba was born on 18 October 1953 in Blantyre, Malawi and died 12 January 2001 in Chileka. He was born in a musical family and he contributed enormously to the development of the Kwela music.

Beginning in 1972 Kachamba toured extensively covering 33 countries in Africa, Europe and the Americas. In May 1988 he toured Finland on the invitation of the Institute for Workers Music, Helsinki, in May 1989 he performed at the Ethnographic Museum of the University of Zürich. In 1991 his band toured Belgium and Germany. In September 1994 Donald Kachamba was invited to the colloquium "Music and Anthropology" in Lisbon to present one of his films. Thereafter he gave lecture performances in Berlin, Frankfurt and Salzburg. The most recent European tour was in January 1995 to the Netherlands, Belgium and France (on the invitation by Radio France).

Kachamba was artist-in-residence at UCLA's Department of Ethnomusicology from November 1999 until July 2000.

Donald Kachamba died on Friday 12 January 2001.

Works

Audio recordings 

 Concert Kwela – Donald Kachamba et son ensemble LDX 274972 CM 212, Le Chant du Monde 1994.
 
 The Kachamba Brothers' Band (1974)
 Donald Kachamba's Band: Simanje-Manje and Kwela from Malawi (1979)
 Donald Kachamba et son ensemble Concert Kwela, Le Chant du Monde (1991)
 Donald Kachamba's Kwela Band: Live and in Kachamba Donald's Studio 1974–1995, popular African music (1999).

Movies 

 Donald Kachamba's Kwela Music. Malawi Twist Encyclopaedia Cinematographica Göttingen, B 2328 (Institute for Scientific Film) 1978
 Donald Kachamba's Kwela Music: Simanje-manje, cha-cha-cha Encyclopaedia Cinematographica, Göttingen 2329 E 1978.

Notes and references 

 
 
 
 
 
 

Malawian culture
1953 births
2001 deaths